Dylan is the thirteenth studio album by American singer-songwriter Bob Dylan, which is made up of outtakes he recorded  for earlier albums.  Columbia Records compiled it with no input from Dylan and released it on November 16, 1973. The album followed the artist's departure from Columbia for Asylum Records, and the announcement of his first major tour since 1966. In Europe the album was re-released in January 1991 with the title Dylan (A Fool Such as I).

Composition and recording
The album is made up from studio outtakes from the previous Dylan releases Self Portrait and New Morning. The nine songs featured on the album consist of six cover songs and three traditional songs, adapted and arranged by Dylan. The first seven tracks were recorded in June 1970 during the New Morning sessions, the last two were recorded in April 1969 during the Self Portrait sessions. The album features a different recording of "Spanish Is the Loving Tongue" from the version previously issued as the B-side of Dylan's 1971 single "Watching the River Flow".

The album cover was designed by art director John Berg. The original photograph featured on the album's front was shot by photographer Al Clayton. The serigraph was carried out by artist Richard Kenerson.

Critical reception and reissues

Although Dylan received very poor reviews upon its release, it managed to reach  in the U.S. and was certified gold by the RIAA. It became the first Bob Dylan album not to chart in the UK, where his albums generally charted higher than in the U.S.

 Dylan was the only Columbia Dylan album not to be reissued on compact disc in the North American market, until 2013 when it was included in the Complete Album Collection box set.

Track listing

References

1973 albums
Albums produced by Bob Johnston
Bob Dylan albums
Bob Dylan compilation albums
Columbia Records albums
Covers albums
Unauthorized albums